The Michigan Mile And One-Eighth Handicap was an American Thoroughbred horse race run annually at the now defunct Detroit Race Course in Livonia, Michigan. A one time Grade II event raced on dirt, it was open to horses age three and older.

First run in 1950, its popularity saw the 1958 edition of the Michigan Mile And One-Eighth Handicap draw the largest crowd in the racetrack's history. That 1958 race was won by E. P. Taylor's Nearctic, a future Canadian Horse Racing Hall of Fame inductee and sire of the supersire Northern Dancer.

In 1975, trainer S Kaye Bell became the first female in the United States to condition the winner of a $100,000 stakes race.

Upsets include Stanislas defeating Tom Rolfe in 1966 and Nodouble in 1968 beating the reigning American Horse of the Year, Damascus.

Records
Speed record:
 1:36.20 @ 1 mile: Nearctic (1958)
 1:40.60 @ 1-1/6 miles: Crimson Satan (1963)
 1:47.40 @ 1-1/8 miles: My Night Out (1957), Calandrito (1969), Fast Hilarious (1970)

Most wins:
 No horse won this race more than once

Most wins by a jockey:
 3 - Earl J. Knapp (1957, 1961, 1966)
 3 - Carlos H. Marquez Sr. (1967, 1969, 1970)

Most wins by a trainer:
 2 - Charles Kerr (1959, 1963)
 2 - H. Allen Jerkens (1972, 1979)

Most wins by an owner:
 No owner won this race more than once

Winners

References

Discontinued horse races
Horse races in Michigan
Graded stakes races in the United States
Open mile category horse races
Recurring sporting events established in 1950
Recurring sporting events disestablished in 1994